Maoricicada iolanthe, also known as the Iolanthe cicada, is a species of insect that is endemic to New Zealand. This species was first described by George Vernon Hudson in 1891.

References

Cicadas of New Zealand
Insects described in 1891
Endemic fauna of New Zealand
Taxa named by George Hudson
Cicadettini
Endemic insects of New Zealand